Glacier Park International Airport  is in Flathead County, Montana, United States, six miles northeast of Kalispell. The airport is owned and operated by the Flathead Municipal Airport Authority, a public agency created by the county in 1974.

The airport's ICAO code was KFCA, and most airlines still use that code for reservations purposes. Most U.S. airports use the same three-letter location identifier for the FAA and IATA, but Glacier Park International Airport is GPI to the FAA and FCA to the IATA (which assigned GPI to Guapi Airport in Colombia).

History
The airport was built in 1942 as Flathead County Airport, from which its IATA and original FAA and ICAO codes were derived. Airline flights operated by Northwest Airlines began in 1950; however, passenger traffic was sparse for years. In 1970 the airport was designated as an international airport and received its current name. In the 1970s and 1980s passenger traffic increased as Hughes Airwest (previously Air West), Western Airlines, Delta Air Lines (which acquired Western), the original Frontier Airlines (1950–1986) and Horizon Air offered new jet service. Jetliners operated into the airport in the past include the Boeing 727-200, Boeing 737-200, Boeing 757-200, McDonnell Douglas DC-9-30 and Fokker F28. The 757 operated by Delta is the largest aircraft ever to have provided scheduled passenger service at the airport.

The terminal was upgraded in 1981, and further upgrades to the terminal, runways and other facilities occurred in the 1990s. Between 1974 and 1998 passenger traffic increased more than fivefold.

Service to Phoenix, Arizona, on US Airways (formerly America West Airlines before it merged with US Airways) ended in 2007. West Coast Airlines served the airport in the 1960s with Fairchild F-27 turboprops flying to Spokane, Seattle and Great Falls before this carrier merged with Bonanza Airlines and Pacific Air Lines to form Air West, which continued F-27 service from Kalispell. Air West was then renamed Hughes Airwest which in turn introduced McDonnell Douglas DC-9-30 jet service. The original Frontier Airlines operated Boeing 737-200s during the 1970s with a routing of Kalispell–Missoula–Bozeman–Salt Lake City–Denver–St. Louis. By the 1980s, Frontier was continuing to operate Boeing 737-200s with Kalispell–Billings–Denver flights. Cascade Airways operated Fairchild Swearingen Metroliners (Metro III model) into FCA until it folded in 1986. In the 1990s, Horizon Air, a subsidiary of Alaska Airlines, flew Fokker F28 jets to Spokane and Seattle in addition to operating propjet service with de Havilland Canada DHC-8 Dash 8s, Dornier 328s and Fairchild Swearingen Metroliners. Current Alaska Airlines service into the airport is operated by Horizon Air with Bombardier Q400 propjets ,which is the largest and fastest member of the Dash 8 family of regional turboprop aircraft.

Facilities
The airport covers 1,525 acres (617 ha) and has two asphalt runways: 2/20 is 9,007 x 150 ft (2,745 x 46 m) and 12/30 is 3,510 x 75 ft (1,070 x 23 m). The airport holds a multitude of private aviation hangars, one commercial terminal, and an FBO to support the general aviation traffic. 

In the year ending January 1, 2007, the airport had 51,925 aircraft operations, average 142 per day: 70% general aviation, 21% air taxi, 8% airline and 1% military. 159 aircraft were then based at this airport: 78% single-engine, 16% multi-engine and 3% jet and 3% helicopter.

Delta operates mainline narrow-body jets and Delta Connection operates regional jets using CRJ and Embraer aircraft. Daily nonstop flights to Minneapolis/St. Paul and Salt Lake City are operated year-round by both Delta and its regional affiliate. This is supplemented by seasonal/summer service to Atlanta on mainline aircraft and Los Angeles on E-175s operated by Compass Airlines.

United Express operates daily nonstop jet service to Denver year-round on CRJ aircraft. During summer, it operates seasonal nonstop jet service to Chicago (six times a week) and San Francisco (daily).

Allegiant Air operates A319s and A320s nonstop twice weekly to Las Vegas and Phoenix/Mesa as well as seasonal bi-weekly service to Oakland and Los Angeles.

Horizon Air and SkyWest operating as Alaska Airlines flies Bombardier Q400s and Embraer ERJ-E175s daily to Seattle and on a seasonal basis to Portland.

Airlines and destinations

Top destinations

See also
 List of airports in Montana

References

External links

 Glacier Park International Airport, official site
 
 

 Glacier Jet Center, Fixed-Base Operator

Airports in Montana
Transportation in Flathead County, Montana
Buildings and structures in Flathead County, Montana
1942 establishments in Montana